Guduvancheri railway station is one of the railway stations of the Chennai Beach–Chengalpattu section of the Chennai Suburban Railway Network. It serves the neighbourhood of Guduvancheri, a suburb of Chennai.

History
The lines at the station were electrified on 9 January 1965, with the electrification of the Tambaram—Chengalpattu section.

See also

 Chennai Suburban Railway

References

External links
 Guduvancheri railway station at IndiaRailInfo.com

Stations of Chennai Suburban Railway
Railway stations in Kanchipuram district